The Desjardins Canal disaster was a rail transport disaster which occurred near Hamilton, Ontario. The train wreck occurred at 6:15p.m. on  when a train on the Great Western Railway crashed through a bridge over the Desjardins Canal, causing the train and its passengers to fall 60 feet into the ice below. With 59 deaths, it is considered one of the worst rail disasters in Canadian history.

Recovery and rescue 

The train had ninety passengers. Most in the last train car survived but others on the train either drowned or succumbed to injury. Locomotive lamps and fires were built to illuminate the scene to aid in rescue efforts. Ropes and ladders were lowered to bring the dead and wounded out of the train cars. One car, partially submerged, was accessed with axes by rescuers.

See also

 Great Western Railway (Ontario)
 List of rail accidents in Canada
 List of rail accidents (before 1880)

References

Further reading
 
 
 

History of Hamilton, Ontario
Railway accidents in 1857
Bridge disasters caused by collision
Railway accidents and incidents in Ontario
Passenger rail transport in Ontario